Coelemu is a Chilean commune and city in Itata Province, Ñuble Region.

Demographics
Of these, 9,845 (61.2%) lived in urban areas and 6,237 (38.8%) in rural areas. Between the 1992 and 2002 censuses, the population grew by 867% (14,419 persons).

Besides the city of Coelemu, within the commune of Coelemu are the following towns and localities (all of less than 1,000 inhabitants):

 Vegas de Itata
 Guarilihue
 Caleta Burea
 Cuadrapangue
 Conai
 Magdalena
 El Pellín
 Ranquelmo
 Perales
 Dinamapu
 Meipo

Administration
As a commune, Coelemu is a third-level administrative division of Chile administered by a municipal council, headed by an alcalde who is directly elected every four years. The 2008-2012 alcalde is Laura Aravena Alarcón (ILE).

Within the electoral divisions of Chile, Coelemu is represented in the Chamber of Deputies by Jorge Sabag (PDC) and Frank Sauerbaum (RN) as part of the 42nd electoral district, together with San Fabián, Ñiquén, San Carlos, San Nicolás, Ninhue, Quirihue, Cobquecura, Treguaco, Portezuelo, Ránquil, Quillón, Bulnes, Cabrero and Yumbel. The commune is represented in the Senate by Alejandro Navarro Brain (MAS) and Hosain Sabag Castillo (PDC) as part of the 12th senatorial constituency (Biobío-Cordillera).

References

Communes of Chile
Populated places in Itata Province